John Bell, O.S.A. ( d1541)  was a  bishop in the late fifteenth and the first decades of the sixteenth century.

He was appointed Bishop of Mayo in 1493, but also worked as a suffragan bishop for the Archbishop of Canterbury.

References 

15th-century Roman Catholic bishops in Ireland
16th-century Roman Catholic bishops in Ireland
Bishops of Mayo
1541 deaths